The men's 400 metres at the 2022 World Athletics U20 Championships was held at the Estadio Olímpico Pascual Guerrero in Cali, Colombia on 2, 3 and 4 August 2022.

Records
U20 standing records prior to the 2022 World Athletics U20 Championships were as follows:

Results

Round 1
The round 1 took place on 2 August, with the 35 athletes involved being splitted into 5 heats, each of 7 athletes. The first 4 athletes in each heat ( Q ) and the next 4 fastest ( q ) qualified to the semi-final. The overall results were as follows:

Semi-final
The semi-final took place on 3 August, with the 24 athletes involved being splitted into 3 heats of 8 athletes each. The first 2 athletes in each heat ( Q ) and the next 2 fastest ( q ) qualified to the final. The overall results were as follows:

Final
The final was started at 18:00 on 4 August. The results were as follows:

References

400 metres men
400 metres at the World Athletics U20 Championships